Charles-Frédéric Kreubé (Lunéville,  5 November 1777 – Saint-Denis, 3 May 1846) was a 19th-century French violinist, conductor and composer.

Biography 
A student of Rodolphe Kreutzer, he was admitted in 1801 into the orchestra of the Opéra-Comique, originally as first violin, became deputy conductor in 1805 and succeeded Frédéric Blasius as first chief in 1816, a position that he would leave in 1828.

He authored music for opéras comiques, arrangements for operas and compositions of numerous plays for Parisian boulevard theatres of the 19th century.

Works 

1803: Aline, reine de Golconde, opera in three acts, by Jean-Baptiste Vial and Edmond Favières, (arrangements)
1805: Le Vaisseau amiral opera in one act, by Saint-Cyr, (arrangements)
1809: Françoise de Foix, in three acts by Jean-Nicolas Bouilly and Emmanuel Dupaty, (operture)
1813: Le Forgeron de Bassora, opéra comique in two acts by Charles Augustin de Bassompierre
1814: Le Portrait de famille ou Les Héritiers punis, opéra comique by Eugène de Planard
1814: La Redingotte et la perruque, opéra comique by Eugène Scribe
1816: Une nuit d'intrigue ou Le Retour du bal masqué, opéra comique by Jean Michel Constant Leber
1816: La Jeune Belle-mère, opéra comique by Charles Augustin de Bassompierre and Théophile Marion Dumersan
1817: L'Héritière, opéra comique by Emmanuel Théaulon
1819: Edmond et Caroline ou La Lettre et la Réponse, comedy in one act by Benoît-Joseph Marsollier des Vivetières, (morceaux détachés voice and piano (or harp)
1820: La Jeune Tante, opéra comique by Anne Honoré Joseph Duveyrier de Mélesville
1821: Le Philosophe en voyage, opera in three acts by Louis-Barthélémy Pradher and Paul de Kock
1822: Le Coq de village, opéra comique by Achille d'Artois
1822: Le Paradis de Mahomet ou La Pluralité des femmes, opéra comique by Scribe and Mélesville
1823: Jenny la Bouquetière, opéra comique by Jean-Nicolas Bouilly, Joseph Marie Pain and Pradher 
1824: L'officier et le paysan, opéra comique by Achille d'Artois
1825: Les Enfans de Maître Pierre, opéra comique in 3 acts, by Paul de Kock, (morceaux détachés voice and piano)
1827: La Lettre posthume, opéra comique by Scribe and Mélesville, after Walter Scott
1828: Le Mariage à l'anglaise, opéra comique in one act by Jean-Baptiste-Charles Vial and Justin Gensoul
 Deuxième Fantaisie pour piano et violon, with Victor Dourlen
 3 Duos concertants pour deux violons
 3 Quatuors pour deux violons, alto et basse
 Septième Recueil de romances, lyrics by Rairio
 Huitième Recueil de romances, lyrics by Hoffman
 Six Romances
 Trio concertant pour deux violons et basse

Bibliography 
 Charles Gabet, Dictionnaire des artistes de l'école française au XIX, 1831, p. 379 
 Félix Crozet, Revue de la musique dramatique en France, 1866, p. 420
 Pierre Larousse, Nouveau Larousse illustré : dictionnaire universel, 1898, p. 503
 Hugo Riemann, Dictionnaire de musique, 1900, p. 427
 Manuel Gómez García, Diccionario Akal de Teatro, 1998, p. 451

References 

French male classical composers
French opera composers
19th-century French male classical violinists
French male conductors (music)
French conductors (music)
People from Lunéville
1777 births
1846 deaths